Team Canada is a professional independent baseball team representing Canada.  They play in the developmental Arizona Winter League and Arizona Summer League, short-season instructional leagues affiliated with the North American League.  The team is owned by Diamond Sports & Entertainment and have played their home and away games since 2009 at Desert Sun Stadium in Yuma.  They replaced the Sonora Pilots, who did not play in 2009 or 2010, yet the Pilots returned in 2011.

Arizona Winter League
Team Canada has played in the AWL's International Division along with the Saskatchewan Silver Sox, Sonora Pilots, Team Mexico and Western Canada Miners as of 2011.

Year-by-year records

Arizona Winter League:

Arizona Summer League
Team Canada was added to the newly expanded four-team ASL along with the Long Beach Armada, Mesa Miners and San Diego Surf Dawgs in 2011.  Their first game is set for July 13, 2011 against Long Beach.

Year-by-year records

Arizona Summer League:

External links
 Arizona Winter League's official website
 North American Baseball League's official website

Arizona Winter League teams
Professional baseball teams in Arizona
2009 establishments in Arizona
Baseball teams established in 2009